Cannabis City is an American recreational marijuana retail store located in Seattle, Washington. The store, located in the SoDo neighborhood south of downtown, opened on July 8, 2014, and was the first of its kind in that city. The store is owned by James Lathrop, a Doctor of Nursing Practice, and a U.S. Desert Storm war veteran. In July, the store was asked to submit historical paraphernalia to Seattle's Museum of History and Industry for preservation.

References

External links
 ABC News tour of the store
 NPR opening day
 NPR store update

2014 establishments in Washington (state)
2014 in cannabis
Cannabis companies of the United States
Cannabis in Washington (state)
Cannabis dispensaries in the United States
Companies based in Seattle
American companies established in 2014